Răcășdia is a commune in Caraș-Severin County, western Romania with a population of 2180 people. It is composed of two villages, Răcășdia and Vrăniuț (Felsővarány).

References

Communes in Caraș-Severin County
Localities in Romanian Banat